Oskar Koplus (24 April 1909 Tartu – 17 November 1975 Tartu) was an Estonian politician. He was a member of Estonian National Assembly.

References

1909 births
1975 deaths
Members of the Estonian National Assembly
Politicians from Tartu